Carole Glasser Langille is a Canadian poet, the author of three books of poetry.

Life

Carole Glasser Langille is the author of four books of poetry, two collections of short stories, two children's books and a non-fiction book "Doing Time: Writing Workshops in Prison."

Her second book of poetry, In Cannon Cave, was nominated for a Governor General's Award in 1997, and the Atlantic Poetry Prize in 1998.  "Church of the Exquisite Panic: The Ophelia Poems" was nominated for The Atlantic Poetry Prize in 2013.                  

"I Am What I Am Because You Are What You Are," her second collection of short stories, was nominated for the Alistair MacLeod Award for Short Fiction.  Her children's book, Where the Wind Sleeps, was the Canadian Children's Book Center Choice in 1996. 

Several selections from Carole Glasser Langille's book of poetry, Late In A Slow Time, have been adapted to music by Canadian composer Chan Ka Nin. The production, also called Late In A Slow Time debuted at the 2006 Sound Symposium in St. John's, Newfoundland and is on Duo Concertante's CD Wildbird. The Depth of This Quiet , by Canadian composer Alice Ping Yee Ho, interprets poems by Carole Glasser Langille using a combination of Eastern and Western instruments and was performed in  New York City in 2017.

Originally from New York City, where she studied with the poets John Ashbery and Carolyn Forche among others, Carole now lives in Black Point, Nova Scotia.

She has taught at The Humber School for Writing Summer Program, Maritime Writer's Workshop, the Community of Writers in Tatamagouche, and at Women's Words the University of Alberta. She has taught Creative Writing at Mount Saint Vincent University, Writing for the Arts at the Nova Scotia College of Art and Design, and currently teaches Creative Writing: Poetry at Dalhousie University.

Carole has given poetry readings in Athens, Delhi, Prague, London England, New York City, Kirkcudbright Scotland, and throughout Canada. She has received Canada Council Grants for poetry, non-fiction and fiction as well as Nova Scotia Cultural

Awards and recognition

 When I Always Wanted Something, long listed for the 2009 ReLit Award for short fiction, 2009.
 In Cannon Cave: Governor General's Award for Poetry, finalist, 1997; Atlantic Poetry Prize finalist, 1998
 CBC Literary Awards, finalist, 1996
 Where the Wind Sleeps: Canadian Children's Book Centre Choice, 1996.
 MacDowell Fellowship, 1986.

Critical observations

Selected publications

Poetry
All That Glitters in Water. (New Poetry Series, Baltimore, 1990)
In Cannon Cave. (Brick Books, 1997)
Late in a Slow Time. (Mansfield Press, 2003)
Church of the Exquisite Panic: The Ophelia Poems, (Pedlar Press, Toronto 2012)

Children
Where the Wind Sleeps.  (Roseway Publishing, 1996)
Interview with a Stick Collector. ( Roseway Publishing, 2004)

Prose
When I Always Wanted Something. (The Mercury Press, 2008)
I Am What I Am Because You Are What You Are (2016)

Anthology
Blood to Remember: American Poets on Holocaust. (Texas University Press, 1991)
Vintage'92. (Sono Nis Press, 1993)
Windhorse Reader: Choice Poems of '93. (Samurai Press, 1993)
Words Out There: Women Poets in Atlantic Canada (Roseway 1999)
Coastlines: The Poetry of Atlantic Canada. (Gooselane 2002)
In Fine Form: The Canadian Book of Form Poetry. (Raincoast Books 2005)
Doing Time, Writing Workshops in Prison, (non-fiction) Pottersfield Press, (January 2020)

References

External links
 https://web.archive.org/web/20101222223214/http://writers.ns.ca/writers/L/langillecarole.html
 http://www.library.utoronto.ca/canpoetry/langille/index.htm
 https://web.archive.org/web/20091008140908/http://www.poets.ca/linktext/direct/langille.htm
 http://english.dal.ca/Programs/Creative%20Writing/Instructors/Carole_Langille.php
  Carole Langille in the Atlantic Canadian Poets Archive

20th-century Canadian poets
21st-century Canadian poets
Canadian women poets
American emigrants to Canada
Year of birth missing (living people)
Living people
Academic staff of the University of Alberta
20th-century Canadian women writers
21st-century Canadian women writers
21st-century Canadian short story writers
Canadian women short story writers